Charles in a Striped Jersey is an 1898 painting by Henri Evenepoel. It was donated to the Heritage Fund of the King Baudouin Foundation in 2008 in honour of Anne and André Leysen. It is now on long-term loan to the Royal Museum of Fine Arts, Antwerp.

References

Paintings of children
1898 paintings
Belgian paintings